The Labor Tribune is a Saint Louis based long form newspaper that focuses on the labor related topics. The newspaper has 60,000 active subscribers and is the official labor newspaper for the Greater Saint Louis and Southern Illinois area. The newspaper was established in 1937 by Maury Rubin and has been in consistent circulation since then.

History

References

Newspapers published in St. Louis
Newspapers established in 1937
1937 establishments in Missouri